Dimitra Arapoglou is a Greek politician. Elected for the 2007–2009 term, she was only the second deaf person in the world to be elected to a parliament. She has spoken openly about the discrimination she has faced as a deaf woman in the Greek Parliament.

Arapoglou is an active member of the Greek deaf community.

See also 
List of deaf people
List of members of the Hellenic Parliament, 2007–09

References

1958 births
Living people
Popular Orthodox Rally politicians
Deaf politicians
Greek MPs 2007–2009
21st-century Greek politicians
21st-century Greek women politicians
Greek deaf people